Power Scale is the first album released by Japanese pop rock trio Iceman on March 26, 1997.

Track listing

References 
 Iceman/DA Family fansite
 Album Artwork

1997 albums